The Army of Mujahideen (Jaysh al-Mujahideen) was a Sunni Islamist rebel group formed in order to fight the Syrian government and the Islamic State of Iraq and the Levant (ISIL) during the Syrian Civil War. Originally a coalition of several Islamist rebel groups, it accused ISIL of disrupting "security and stability" in areas that had been captured from the Syrian government. During its establishment in January 2014, the spokesperson of the coalition said it would start operations in Idlib and Aleppo and gradually expand towards the rest of Syria. In December 2016, the Army of Mujahideen was briefly reorganized as Jabhat Ahl al-Sham (Front of the People of the Levant), but this formation soon fell apart during rebel infighting in January 2017.

Ideology
The Army of Mujahideen did not have a political program. Although the member groups have an Islamist identity, they were largely non-ideological Free Syrian Army affiliated groups formed earlier in the Syrian Civil War.

History

The factions which formed the Army of Mujahideen largely emerged from the villages and towns of the Aleppo hinterland.  The three groups at the core of the alliance were Division 19, the Fastaqim Union and the Nour al-Din al-Zanki Islamic Brigades, which was also then part of the Authenticity and Development Front.

In March 2014, members of one of its component groups, the Fastaqim Union, stopped Marcell Shehwaro, a Syrian Christian opposition activist, and demanded her to wear a hijab. She refused and was arrested, taken to a Sharia court, and forced to sign an agreement pledging to wear the hijab. An Army of Mujahideen commander issued a statement apologizing for its fighters' violent actions, but the ruling requiring Shehwaro to wear a hijab still stood.

On 4 May 2014, the Army of Mujahideen announced the withdrawal of the Nour al-Din al-Zanki Islamic Brigades from the coalition. On 3 June 2014, the Army of Mujahideen announced the expulsion of Division 19's Ansar Brigade and its leader, Abu Bakr, accusing them of theft and kidnapping.

Charles Lister, of the Brookings Doha Center, described the Army of Mujahideen as being a shadow of its former self by August 2014, partially due to a reduction in support it had received from foreign states. Fastaqim Kama Umirt left the group around December 2014.

In September 2014, the United States began planning weapon supplies to the group, and in the same month, fifty of the group's fighters were given military training in Qatar and supplied with BGM-71 TOW anti-tank missiles in a covert CIA program.

On 6 May 2015, it, along with 13 other Aleppo-based groups, joined the Fatah Halab joint operations room.

It announced its support to Turkey against the Kurdistan Workers Party. It also fights the Syrian Democratic Forces in Aleppo.

Several factions of the group, including the al-Noor Islamic Movement, the Amjad al-Islam Brigade, and the al-Quds Brigades left to join the Revolutionaries of the Levant Battalions in April 2015.

In December 2016, the Army of Mujahideen re-merged with Thuwar al-Sham Battalion and the Banner of Islam Movement to form Jabhat Ahl al-Sham.

On 23 January 2017, the al-Nusra Front attacked Jabhat Ahl al-Sham bases in Atarib and other towns in western Aleppo. All the bases were captured and by 24 January, the group was defeated and joined Ahrar al-Sham.

Member groups
 Army of Mujahideen
 19th Division 
 Ansar Brigade
 Supporters of the Caliphate Brigade(denied by group)
 Khan al-Asal Free Brigades
 Ash-Shuyukh Brigade
 Muhajireen Brigade
Farouq Battalion
5th Battalion
Revolutionaries of Atarib Gathering
Atarib Martyrs Brigade
Battalion of the Martyr Alaa al-Ahmad
Central Force for the City of Atarib
Ansar al-Haqq Battalion
Loyalty to God Battalion
Shells of Justice Brigade

Former member groups
 Nour al-Din al-Zenki Islamic Battalions
Levant Revolutionaries Battalions
 al-Quds Brigades
 Glory of Islam Brigade
 al-Noor Islamic Movement
Banners of Islam Movement
 Fastaqim Union
 Azadî Battalion
 Liwa Jund al-Haramain (Formerly part of the 19th Division, later joined the Syrian Democratic Forces.)

See also
 List of armed groups in the Syrian Civil War

References

Anti-government factions of the Syrian civil war
Free Syrian Army
Anti-ISIL factions in Syria
Military units and formations established in 2014
Military units and formations disestablished in 2017